John Sadri (born September 19, 1956) is a former tennis player from the United States. Sadri, an All-American at North Carolina State, reached the finals of the 1978 men's NCAA singles championship, losing to John McEnroe in four sets. He reached the final of the 1979 Australian Open, won two singles titles and achieved a career-high singles ranking of World No. 13 in September 1980. Sadri formerly ran a junior tennis academy at Russell Tennis Center in Charlotte, North Carolina.

Grand Slam finals

Singles (1 runner-up)

Grand Slam tournament performance timeline

Singles

Career finals

Singles (2 wins, 3 losses)

Doubles (3 wins, 6 losses)

References

External links 
 
 

1956 births
Living people
American male tennis players
NC State Wolfpack men's tennis players
Sportspeople from Charlotte, North Carolina
Tennis people from North Carolina